The Church of St Mary and St Joseph is a 20th-century Roman Catholic parish church in Tower Hamlets, London, England.

History
The modern church was built in 1951-1954, as part of the Festival of Britain's Lansbury Estate Live Architecture Exhibition, and was consecrated by Cardinal Godfrey in October 1960. It replaced an earlier church of the 1850s by William Wardell that was destroyed in the Second World War.

Architecture
The building is listed Grade II. Its architect was Adrian Gilbert Scott, who specialised in ecclesiastical buildings.

On a Greek Cross plan, it is built of steel girders and brick, with a reinforced concrete spire. On the outside, the plan becomes a series of rectangular blocks.

It is notable for its elongated and tapered round parabolic arches (described as 'camel vaulted' at the time of its listing). Its mixed or transitional style combines Art Deco or Jazz Modern with elements suggesting Hispanic Moorish, ancient Persian or Egyptian. Gavin Stamp's description of 'Jazz Modern Byzantine' was used in the church's listing.

The design has similarities to work by Giles Gilbert Scott and to Adrian Gilbert Scott's own earlier St. James Anglican Church (Vancouver), and its parabolic arches informed his later work on St Leonard's Church, St Leonards-on-Sea.

The interior contains stone reliefs of the Stations of the Cross by Peter Watts. The stained glass is by William Wilson of Edinburgh.

External links
 
 'Poplar – St Mary and St Joseph, Upper North Street, London E14'  in Taking Stock: Catholic Churches of England & Wales 
  'William Wilson: Print | Paint | Glass: 8 October - 13 November 2022', Royal Scottish Academy 
 'Church of the Month', Londonosaurus
 Oliver Wainwright, 'Architects hark back to Festival of Britain with "vertical carnival"', The Guardian

References

Roman Catholic churches completed in 1954
Churches in the Roman Catholic Diocese of Westminster
1960 establishments in England
20th-century Roman Catholic church buildings in the United Kingdom